This is a list of all hat-tricks scored during UEFA European Championships; that is, the occasions when a footballer has scored three or more goals in a single football European Championship match (not including qualification matches). Scoring a hat-trick in a European Championship is a relatively rare event: only eight hat-tricks have been scored in the 15 editions of the European Championships. As UEFA is the governing body of European association football, official hat-tricks are only noted when UEFA recognises that at least three goals were scored by one player in one match.

The tournament was first held in 1960, but there were no hat-tricks in any of the first four editions. In the semi-finals of the 1976 competition, Dieter Müller scored the first hat-trick in his first international game, as West Germany came from behind to defeat Yugoslavia 4–2 after extra time. Four years later, his compatriot Klaus Allofs scored the second hat-trick, in a 3–2 group stage win over the Netherlands. The first tournament to see more than one hat-trick was in 1984, both by France captain Michel Platini, who is the only player to score more than one European Championship hat-trick; his first against Yugoslavia is the quickest hat-trick in the history of the competition, with all three goals coming in the space of 18 minutes. After Marco van Basten's three goals for the Netherlands in a 3–1 group stage win over England in 1988, there were no hat-tricks in 1992 or 1996.

At UEFA Euro 2000, there were a joint-record two hat-tricks: Sérgio Conceição scored all of the goals in Portugal's group stage victory over Germany, and Patrick Kluivert recorded three goals in the Netherlands' 6–1 win over Yugoslavia in the quarter-finals. The most recent hat-trick to be scored at the European Championship finals was by Spain's David Villa, who scored three times in a 4–1 win over Russia in the group stage of the 2008 tournament.

Every player who has scored a hat-trick in the European Championship has ended on the winning team in that match. On all but four occasions they have ended up winning the tournament. No player has scored in a European Championship final, nor has any recorded more than three goals in the same game.

Hat-tricks

See also 
 UEFA European Championship

References 

Hat-tricks
UEFA European Championship hat-tricks
UEFA European Championship hat-tricks